CJHK-FM is a Canadian radio station broadcasting a country format at 100.7 FM in Bridgewater, Nova Scotia. CJHK is located in the former Canada Post building, along with sister station CKBW-FM.

Both stations are owned & operated by Acadia Broadcasting.

History
The station received CRTC approval to operate at 100.7 FM on April 24, 2009, and began broadcasting on July 22, 2010, as 100.7 Hank FM with a country format.

On September 29, 2014, CJHK was rebranded to Country 100.7, but kept the same format.

References

External links
Country 100.7
CJHK-FM history - Canadian Communication Foundation

Bridgewater, Nova Scotia
Jhk
Jhk
Jhk
Radio stations established in 2010
2010 establishments in Nova Scotia